The merveilleux (marvelous) is a small cake that originated in France and is now found in Belgium and some U.S. cities. It consists of a sandwich of two light meringues welded with whipped cream which has been covered with whipped cream and dusted with chocolate shavings. A candied cherry sometimes decorates the cake.

The confectioner and chocolatier Pierre Marcolini developed his own version, as did the French confectioner Frédéric Vaucamps, and Etty Benhamou of Le Mervetty. Vaucamp named each of his variations using comparable adjectives– 
Impensable or unthinkable for coffee, Excentrique or eccentric for cherry, and Magnifique or magnificent for praline. He also used names derived from the association of the word merveilleux with French fashion of the late 18th century: Sans-Culotte for caramel. His Incroyable, which uses speculoos cream and white chocolate shavings, translates as unbelievable but is also a term paired with merveilleux in French fashion.

In various French provinces, the "boule choco", "boule meringuée au chocolat" or "arlequin" uses chocolate butter cream in place of whipped cream and the cake is completely surrounded by chocolate chips and takes the shape of a ball.

See also 
 List of cakes
 Angel pie, an American dessert pie made with a meringue shell
 Incroyables and Merveilleuses, French fashion trend, 1795–1799

References

Further reading 
, May/June 2009
, Recipe
 Willy Bal et al., Belgicismes: inventaire des particularités lexicales du français en Belgique (Louvain-la-Neuve: Duculot, 1994), page 90

French pastries
Meringue desserts
Belgian confectionery